John-Paul Honoré Langbroek (born 31 January 1961) is an Australian politician who has been a member of the Legislative Assembly of Queensland representing the centre-right Liberal Party and its successor, the centre-right Liberal National Party, in the seat of Surfers Paradise since 2004. He was Leader of the Opposition and parliamentary leader of the LNP from 2009 to 2011—the first person from the Liberal side of the merger to hold the post. He was a minister in the Newman government before its defeat at the 2015 state election.

Early life
Langbroek was born in Assen in the Netherlands. He and his sister, Melbourne-based media personality Kate Langbroek, grew up as the only two children of Jehovah's Witnesses. His family emigrated to Australia in mid-1961, just months after his birth. The family travelled around rural Queensland where Langbroek Sr worked at various schools.

Early career
A graduate of Sunnybank State High School, he went on to study at the University of Queensland, receiving an honours degree in dental science. At university he showed no early sign of an interest in politics, describing his student days at the University of Queensland as being "toga parties, Lacoste shirts and university japes".

He finished his degree in 1983 and departed for London where he met his wife Stacey.

Political career
Langbroek entered politics in 2001 when he stood as the Liberal candidate in the May 2001 by-election for Surfers Paradise. The by-election was triggered by the resignation of the previous member, former National Party Premier Rob Borbidge who had just led the Coalition to a landslide defeat in the general election earlier in 2001. Due to voter anger at being forced to the polls for the second time in three months, the National vote tumbled to eight percent. This left Langbroek far short of the support he needed to overtake Gold Coast councillor and former mayor Lex Bell, who won the seat as an independent. Langbroek stood again in Surfers Paradise at the 2004 state election and won convincingly with Bell being pushed into third place. He has held the seat comfortably ever since, and as of the 2017 election sits on a majority of 19.8 percent, making Surfers Paradise the safest LNP seat in the chamber.

Opposition (2005–09)
As an MP he had served in the opposition shadow ministry for a number of years. He has held various shadow portfolios, including health, public works, mines and energy and immediately before his ascension to the leadership he has served as Shadow Minister for Education and Skills and Shadow Minister for the Arts from 12 August 2008.

Leader of the opposition (2009–11)
Langbroek was elected leader of the LNP following the 2009 state election after the LNP's first leader, Lawrence Springborg, announced his retirement. Langbroek named Springborg as his deputy.  Langbroek's election marked the first time in 84 years that the non-Labor side in Queensland had been led by someone aligned federally with the Liberals or their predecessors.  The Nationals have historically been the stronger non-Labor party in the state, and had been the dominant partner in the non-Labor Coalition from 1925 until the formation of the LNP in 2008.

Polling for much of 2009 and 2010 showed the LNP ahead of Labor on the two-party vote, and Langbroek consistently led incumbent Labor Premier Anna Bligh as preferred premier. However, after Labor's numbers rebounded in the wake of the Queensland floods, Langbroek came under growing pressure from the LNP's organisational wing to stand down. According to Nine News Queensland's Spencer Jolly, LNP president Bruce McIver was trying to engineer a by-election to get Brisbane Lord Mayor Campbell Newman, also from the Liberal side of the merger, elected to the legislature so Newman could challenge Langbroek for the LNP leadership.

On 22 March 2011, Newman announced he would be seeking pre-selection for the seat of Ashgrove, and would challenge for the LNP leadership if successful. Later that day, Langbroek and Springborg announced their resignations as leader and deputy leader, respectively. While a February poll showed the LNP with 55 percent two-party support—enough to make Langbroek premier—internal Coalition polling suggested that under Newman, the LNP would win government "in a canter". As late as the previous day, Langbroek had insisted that he would not resign, and even demanded that McIver and the rest of the organisational wing either back down from their attempts to push him out or resign themselves. He appeared to have the support of most of the party room as well. However, within hours of Newman's announcement, Langbroek gave way.

Newman frontbencher (2011–15)
Newman appointed Langbroek Shadow Police Minister in his Shadow Cabinet.

After the LNP landslide in the 2012 election, Langbroek was made Minister for Education, Training and Employment in the Newman Ministry.

Post Newman (2015–)
Following Newman government's defeat in the 2015 election, Langbroek became Deputy leader of the LNP and Deputy Leader of the Opposition. He left the position after Lawrence Springborg lost the leadership to Tim Nicholls with Deb Frecklington replacing Langbroek in his position as deputy leader.

He has remained on the opposition frontbench under Nicholls, Frecklington and Crisafulli.

After Nicholls stood down as leader after the 2017 election, Langbroek stood for the LNP leadership again finishing second to Frecklington with 10 votes to her 25, with 3 for Mark Robinson.

Personal
Langbroek is married and has three children. Although he has not shown a clear rejection of his parents' religion (Jehovah's Witnesses), he does not discuss the topic at length.
He has expressed the pain of having a relative with motor neurone disease. Describing the disease as having "destroyed his family", causing his 58-year-old brother-in-law to need constant nursing and causing potentially fatal weight loss.

References

External links
Official Website
Liberal National Party Page for John-Paul Langbroek

1961 births
Living people
Liberal Party of Australia members of the Parliament of Queensland
Liberal National Party of Queensland politicians
Members of the Queensland Legislative Assembly
People from Assen
Australian people of American descent
Australian people of Jamaican descent
Dutch emigrants to Australia
Dutch people of American descent
Dutch people of Jamaican descent
Leaders of the Opposition in Queensland
Former Jehovah's Witnesses
People educated at Brisbane State High School
People from the Gold Coast, Queensland
21st-century Australian politicians
Deputy opposition leaders